The Roman Catholic Diocese of Amiens (Latin: Dioecesis Ambianensis; French: Diocèse d'Amiens) is a diocese of the Latin Church of the Roman Catholic Church in France. The diocese comprises the department of Somme, of which the city of Amiens is the capital.

History

The diocese of Amiens was a suffragan of the Archdiocese of Reims during the old regime; it was made subordinate to the diocese of Paris under the Concordat of 1801, from 1802 to 1822; and then in 1822 it became a suffragan of Reims again.

Louis Duchesne denies any value to the legend of two Saints Firmin, honoured on the first and twenty-fifth of September, as the first and third Bishops of Amiens. The legend is of the 8th century and incoherent. Regardless of whether a St. Firmin, native of Pampeluna, was martyred during the Diocletianic Persecution, it is certain that the first bishop known to history is St. Eulogius, who defended the divinity of Christ in the councils held during the middle of the 4th century.

Cathedral and churches
The cathedral (13th century) is an admirable Gothic monument, and was made the subject of careful study by John Ruskin in his Bible of Amiens. The nave of this cathedral is considered a type of the ideal Gothic.

Cathedral Chapter

The Cathedral of Notre Dame d'Amiens was served by a Chapter composed of eight dignities and forty-six Canons. The dignities were: the Dean, the Provost, the Chancellor, the Archdeacon of Amiens, the Archdeacon of Ponthieu, the Cantor, the Master of the Schola, and the Penitentiary. The Dean was elected by the Chapter.

Churches

The city of Amiens also had a Collegiate Church of Saint-Firmin, whose Chapter was composed of a Dean and six prebendaries. All were elected by the Chapter and installed by the bishop. Saint-Nicolas-au-Cloître d'Amiens also had a Chapter, composed of a Dean and eight prebendaries, all elected by the Chapter and installed by the bishop.

The church of St. Acheul, near Amiens, and formerly its cathedral, was, in the 19th century, the home of a major Jesuit novitiate. The beautiful churches of St. Ricquier and Corbie perpetuate the memory of the great Benedictine abbeys and homes of learning founded in these places in 570 and 662.

In 859 the Normans invaded the valley of the Somme, and sacked the abbey of Saint-Riquier. They pillaged Amiens and held it for more than a year, until the city was ransomed by Charles the Bald.

Bishops

There is a medieval list of the Bishops of Amiens, but it first appears in the work of Robert of Torigni in the second half of the 12th century, and its names before the 8th century are very uncertain.

to 1000
 [c. 300: Firminus,] first bishop, and martyr
 [4th century: Firminus the Younger,] second bishop, and confessor
c. 346: Eulogius
5th century: Leodardus
circa 450: Audoenus
c. 511: Edibius
c. 549: Beatus
 [c. 554: Honoratus]
 [circa 600: Salvius]
c. 614: Berachundus
c. 650: Bertofredus
[circa 670: Thodefridus]
7th century: Deodatus
7th century: Dado
c. 692–c. 697: Ursinianus
 [c. 721: Dominicus]
before 728 – 746: Christianus
c. 748–768: Raimbertus
c. 777?: Vitultus
c. 769–798/799: Georgius
c. 799–831: Jesse
 830–833, 834–849: Ragenar
 849–872: Hilmerad
c. 875: Geroldus
c. 892–928: Otgarius
c. 929–947: Deroldus
 [947: Thibault] (Intrusus)
 from c. 949: Ragembaldus
 [972–975: Thibaud] (again)
c. 975–980: Almannus
c. 980–992: Gotesmannus
 c. 993–c. 1030: Fulco

1000 to 1300

 c.  1032–1058: Fulco
 1058–1074: Gui de Ponthieu
 [1076 Fulco]
 1078–1079: Raoul
 1080–1085: Roric
 1091–1101: Gervin
 1101–1104: Sede vacante
 1104–1115: Godfrey of Amiens
 1116–1127: Enguerrand de Boves
 1127–1144: Guérin de Chastillon-Saint-Pol
 1144–1164: Theoderic (Dietrich)
circa 1164–1169: Robert I.
 1169–1204: Thibaud d'Heilly
circa 1204–1210: Richard de Gerberoy
circa 1211–1222: Evrard de Fouilloy
circa 1222–1236: Geoffroy d'Eu
 1236–1247: Arnold
 1247–1257: Gérard de Conchy
 1258–1259: Aleaume de Neuilly
 1259–1278: Bernard d'Abbeville
 1278–1308: Guillaume de Mâcon

1300 to 1500

 1308–1321: Robert de Fouilloy
 1321–1325: Simon de Goucans
 1326–1373: Jean de Cherchemont
 1373–1375: Jean de la Grange (Cardinal)
 1376–1388: Jean Rolland
 1389–1410: Jean de Boissy (Avignon Obedience)
 1411–1413: Bernard de Chevenon
 1413–1418: Philibert de Saulx
 1418–1433: Jean d'Harcourt
 1433–1436: Jean le Jeune
 1436–1437: Francesco Condulmer (Administrator)
 1437–1456: Jean Avantage
 1457–1473: Ferry de Beauvoir
 1473–1476: Jean de Gaucourt
 1476–1478: Louis de Gaucourt
 1482–1501: Pierre Versé

1500 to 1800

 1501–1503: Philip of Cleves
 1503–1538: François de Hallvyn
 1538–1540: Cardinal Charles Hémard de Denonville
 1540–1546: Cardinal Claude de Longwy de Givry (Administrator)
 1546–1552: François de Pisseleu
 1552–1562: Nicolas de Pellevé
 1564–1574: Antoine de Créqui
 1574–1577: vacant
 1577–1617: Geoffroy de La Marthonie
 1617–1652: François Lefèvre de Caumartin
 1653–1687: François Faure
 [1687]–1706: Henri Feydeau de Brou
 1707–1733: Pierre de Sabatier
 1734–1774: Louis-François-Gabriel d'Orléans de La Motte
 1774–1791: Louis-Charles de Machault
 1791–1801: Eléonore-Marie Desbois (Constitutional Bishop of Somme)

From 1800
Jean-Chrysostome de Villaret  (9 April 1802 – 17 December 1804) 
Jean-François de Mandolx  (17 December 1804 – 14 August 1817)
Marc Marie, Marquis de Bombelles (23 August 1819 – 5 March 1822 Died)  
Jean-Pierre de Gallien de Chabons  (27 Mar 1822 Appointed – 9 November 1837) 
Jean-Marie Mioland (12 February 1838 – 2 April 1849) 
Louis-Antoine de Salinis  (2 April 1849 – 12 February 1856) 
Jacques-Antoine-Claude-Marie Boudinet  (16 June 1856 – 1 April 1873)
Louis-Désiré-César Bataille  (19 June 1873 – 9 June 1879) 
Aimé-Victor-François Guilbert  (2 September 1879 – 9 July 1883) 
Pierre Henri Lamazou  (3 July 1883 – 10 July 1883)
Jean-Baptiste-Marie-Simon Jacquenet  (27 March 1884 – 1 March 1892)
René-François Renou (19 January 1893 – 30 May 1896) 
Jean-Marie-Léon Dizien (25 June 1896 – 27 March 1915)
Pierre-Florent-André du Bois de la Villerabel (1 Jun 1915 Appointed – 16 Dec 1920 Appointed, Archbishop of Rouen) 
Charles-Albert-Joseph Lecomte (10 Mar 1921 Appointed – 17 Aug 1934 Died) 
Lucien-Louis-Claude Martin (29 May 1935 Appointed – 26 Dec 1945 Died) 
Albert-Paul Droulers (17 Feb 1947 Appointed – 3 Jun 1950 Died) 
René-Louis-Marie Stourm (19 Jan 1951 Appointed – 27 Oct 1962 Appointed, Archbishop of Sens) 
Géry-Jacques-Charles Leuliet (14 Feb 1963 Appointed – 15 Jan 1985 Retired) 
François Jacques Bussini (28 Dec 1985 Appointed – 6 Mar 1987 Resigned) 
Jacques Moïse Eugène Noyer (31 Oct 1987 Appointed – 10 Mar 2003 Retired) 
Jean-Luc Marie Maurice Louis Bouilleret (10 Mar 2003 – 10 Oct 2013 Appointed Archbishop of Besançon)
Olivier Leborgne (20 Feb 2014 Appointed  – 4 Sep 2020 Appointed, Bishop of Arras)
Gérard Le Stang (20 Mar 2021 Appointed – present)

See also
Catholic Church in France
List of Catholic dioceses in France

Notes and references

Sources

Reference works
  (Use with caution; obsolete)
  (in Latin) 
 (in Latin)

Studies
 Vol. 2; Vol. 3.
 
 (in French)

Millet, Hélène; Desportes, Pierre (ed.) (1996). Fasti Ecclesiae Gallicanae. Répertoire prosopographique des évêques, dignitaires et chanoines des dioceses de France de 1200 à 1500. I. Diocèse d’Amiens. Turnhout, Brepols.

External links
  Centre national des Archives de l'Église de France, L’Épiscopat francais depuis 1919, retrieved: 2016-12-24.

Acknowledgment

Roman Catholic dioceses in France
Somme (department)